Mont-Saint-Pierre Ecological Reserve is an ecological reserve in Quebec, Canada. It was established on January 31, 2001.

References

External links
 Official website from Government of Québec

Protected areas of Gaspésie–Îles-de-la-Madeleine
Nature reserves in Quebec
Protected areas established in 2001
2001 establishments in Quebec